Microcarina is a genus of sea snails, marine gastropod mollusks, unassigned in the superfamily Seguenzioidea.

Species
Species within the genus Microcarina include:
 Microcarina crenulata (Powell, 1937)
 Microcarina mayii (Tate, 1899)
 Microcarina surgerea Laseron, 1954

References

 Kano Y., Chikyu, E. & Warén, A. (2009) Morphological, ecological and molecular characterization of the enigmatic planispiral snail genus Adeuomphalus (Vetigastropoda: Seguenzioidea). Journal of Molluscan Studies, 75:397-418.

External links
 To World Register of Marine Species
 Charles F. Laseron, Revision of the Liotiidae of New South Wales, The Australia  Zoologist, Royal Zoological Society of new South Wales, v. 12, 1954, p. 17